Oktyabrskoye is a rural locality (a selo) and the administrative center of Oktyabrskoye Rural Settlement, Povorinsky District, Voronezh Oblast, Russia. The population was 115 as of 2010. There are 19 streets.

Geography 
Oktyabrskoye is located 23 km west of Povorino (the district's administrative centre) by road. Rozhdestvenskoye is the nearest rural locality.

References 

Rural localities in Povorinsky District
Novokhopyorsky Uyezd